Baratili San Pietro is a comune (municipality) in the Province of Oristano in the Italian region Sardinia, located about  northwest of Cagliari and about  north of Oristano.

Baratili San Pietro borders the following municipalities: Nurachi, Oristano, Riola Sardo, San Vero Milis, Zeddiani.

Demographic evolution

References

Cities and towns in Sardinia